Clay Scofield is an American farmer and politician. A Republican, he has served as a member of the Alabama State Senate from the 9th District since November 3, 2010.

In May 2019, he voted to make abortion a crime at any stage in a pregnancy, with no exemptions for cases of rape or incest. The bill had no penalty for the mother, just for the abortionist.

References

External links
 Biography at Alabama Legislature
 Political profile at Bama Politics
 Vote Smart - Clay Scofield profile

1980 births
21st-century American politicians
Living people
Republican Party Alabama state senators